Pipe Creek Township is one of fourteen townships in Miami County, Indiana, United States. As of the 2010 census, its population was 6,294 and it contained 2,936 housing units. The north three-quarters of Grissom Joint Air Reserve Base is in the southwest corner of the township.

History
Pipe Creek Township was organized by the county commissioners on September 6, 1843, and named for its largest stream, Pipe Creek.

The B-17G "Flying Fortress" No. 44-83690 and Terrell Jacobs Circus Winter Quarters are listed on the National Register of Historic Places.

Geography

Cities, towns, villages
 Bunker Hill

Unincorporated towns
 Flora at 
 Nead at 
 Wells at

Extinct towns
 Leonda

Cemeteries
The township contains these four cemeteries: Garnand, Leonda, Metzger and Springdale.

Major highways
  U.S. Route 31

Airports and landing strips
 Weed Field Airport

School districts
 Maconaquah School Corporation

Political districts
 Indiana's 5th congressional district
 State House District 23
 State House District 24
 State Senate District 18

References
 
 United States Census Bureau 2008 TIGER/Line Shapefiles
 IndianaMap

External links
 Indiana Township Association
 United Township Association of Indiana
 City-Data.com page for Pipe Creek Township

Townships in Miami County, Indiana
Townships in Indiana